Barbara Ling is an American production designer. In 2020, she and set decorator Nancy Haigh won the Academy Award for Best Production Design for their work on Once Upon a Time in Hollywood.

Biography 
She grew up in Los Angeles and worked on numerous films, including Batman Forever, and Batman & Robin.

Filmography

References

External links 

Best Art Direction Academy Award winners
Year of birth missing (living people)
Living people
American production designers